William III of Ponthieu ( – 1172) also called William (II; III) Talvas. He was seigneur de Montgomery in Normandy and Count of Ponthieu.

Life
William was son of Robert II of Bellême and Agnes of Ponthieu. He succeeded his father as count of Ponthieu some time between 1105 and 1111, when he alone as count made a gift to the abbey of Cluny. His father Robert de Bellême had turned against Henry I on several occasions, had escaped capture at the battle of Tinchebrai in 1106 commanding Duke Robert's rear guard and later, while serving as envoy for King Louis of France, he was arrested by Henry I and imprisoned for life. William was naturally driven by this to oppose King Henry. In June 1119, however, Henry I restored all his father's lands in Normandy. Sometime prior to 1126, William resigned the county of Ponthieu to his son Guy but retained the title of count. In 1135 Henry I again confiscated all his Norman lands to which William responded by joining count Geoffrey of Anjou in his invasion of Normandy after Henry I's death.

Family
He married, abt. 1115, Helie of Burgundy, daughter of Eudes I, Duke of Burgundy. The Gesta Normannorum Ducum says that they had five children, three sons and two daughters.  Europäische Stammtafeln, however, shows eleven. The five both agree on are:
 
 Guy II. He assumed the county of Ponthieu during his father Talvas' lifetime, but died in 1147 predeceasing his father.
 William, Count of Alençon.
 John I, Count of Alençon, married Beatrix d'Anjou, daughter of Elias II, Count of Maine and Philippa, daughter of Rotrou III, Count of Perche.  
 Clemence married (abt. 1189) Juhel, son of Walter of Mayenne.
 Adela (aka Ela) married William de Warenne, 3rd Earl of Surrey. She married, secondly, Patrick of Salisbury.

References

Additional References
The Gesta Normannorum Ducum of William of Jumièges, Orderic Vitalis, and Robert of Torigni, edited and translated by Elisabeth M. C. Van Houts, Clarendon Press, Oxford, 1995.

Notes

Counts of Ponthieu
12th-century Normans
1090s births
1172 deaths
Clan Montgomery